(which is also referred to as HS-22) is a unit in the Japanese Maritime Self-Defence Force. It is a part of the Fleet Air Force and comes under the authority of Fleet Air Wing 21. Equipped with Mitsubishi SH-60J & SH-60K anti-submarine warfare helicopters, it is based at Omura Air Base in Nagasaki Prefecture.

Squadron structure
The squadron is composed of three flights: 
 221st Flight is equipped with SH-60K helicopters
 222nd flight is equipped with SH-60K helicopters 
 223rd Flight is equipped with SH-60J helicopters

References

Aviation in Japan
Units and formations of the Japan Maritime Self-Defense Force
Military units and formations established in 2008